Luis Carlos Arias Cardona (born January 13, 1985) is a Colombian footballer who currently plays as a left midfielder for Nacional Potosí.

Club career

At the beginning of his career
He started his career in Rionegro-Antioquia, where he had played from 2006 to 2008.  Due to his performance he was recruited by DIM.

Independiente Medellín
In 2009, he was brought in to strengthen DIM, in which he was an important player in gaining its fifth title in the 2009 Categoría Primera season. During that year, he scored the best goal of his career, which made his team win the game against Cúcuta Deportivo with a score 2-1.  One year later, he played in Copa Libertadores for the first time in his career. After playing two years in Medellín, he left Independiente Medellín to move to Deportivo Toluca of Mexico. However, his career did not thrive in that club, so he returned to Independiente Medellín, the same one that had him under contract.

Return to Medellín
For the second semester of 2011, it was decided to loan him to Deportes Tolima, but finally, as the player was going to be borrowed and not sold to the Tolima club, he came back to Medallo to play Torneo finalización 2011.

Independiente Santa Fe
 On January 4, 2012, his transfer to Santa Fe was confirmed. During his first year in one of the clubs from the Colombian capital city, he played a major part in securing the team's seventh star at Torneo Apertura, ending 36 years of failure to gain a title in the league. In 2013, he won his second title with the team, Superliga del 2013, making two essential goals. In that year, Luis played in the League and in Copa Libertadores. However, he was injured during the quarter-finals, and was unable to play for a period. During the first semester of 2014, he recovered from his injury to play in Copa Libertadores and Liga Postobon. In the second semester, he managed to get the eight-Liga Postobon-title teaming up with Daniel Torres, Omar Pérez, Francisco Meza, Juan Daniel Roa and Luis Manuel Seijas, in a final against the paisa team, Independiente Medellín, whom he scored the goal that assured his team's victory. He continued in Independiente Santa Fe until 2015, then returned to Independiente Medellín.

Independiente Medellín 
In 2015, a former DIM's coach, Leonel Álvarez, brings him back to play Torneo Finalización 2015 losing semi-finals against his local rival, Atlético Nacional, in a global score 1-2 against the red team. For the next year, he manage to show a much-better performance than the one he had in 2009 at Torneo Apertura 2016. During that season, in a game against Atlético Huila, he scores an amazing-free kick goal that finished in the first position of a Top 5-sport channel, Win Sports. In many dim websites like Dalerojo.net, he has been considered a poderoso idol.

Career statistics

References

External links
 
 
 200.118.0.31 Golgolgol.net Profile
 Dalerojo.net

1985 births
Living people
Colombian footballers
Colombian expatriate footballers
Colombia international footballers
Footballers from Medellín
Categoría Primera A players
Categoría Primera B players
Bolivian Primera División players
Liga MX players
Leones F.C. footballers
Independiente Medellín footballers
Deportivo Toluca F.C. players
Independiente Santa Fe footballers
Deportivo Pasto footballers
Unión Magdalena footballers
Nacional Potosí players
Association football midfielders
Colombian expatriate sportspeople in Mexico
Colombian expatriate sportspeople in Bolivia
Expatriate footballers in Mexico
Expatriate footballers in Bolivia